The Capt. Mial Pierce Farm is a historic farm at 177 Hornbine Road in Rehoboth, Massachusetts.  The central element of this farm complex is a -story wood-frame house built c. 1800, probably by Mial Pierce, a local militia captain in the American Revolutionary War, who is buried in a family plot on the property.  The house is a Cape style cottage, which originally had a central chimney (removed during alterations c. 1850).  There are two service ells dating to the 19th century.  The complex includes a number of 19th century farm-related outbuildings.

The property was listed on the National Register of Historic Places in 1983.

See also
National Register of Historic Places listings in Bristol County, Massachusetts

References

Farms on the National Register of Historic Places in Massachusetts
Buildings and structures in Rehoboth, Massachusetts
National Register of Historic Places in Bristol County, Massachusetts